The Disordered Structure Refinement program (DSR), written by Daniel Kratzert, is designed to simplify the modeling of molecular disorder in crystal structures using SHELXL by George M. Sheldrick. It has a database of approximately 120 standard solvent molecules and molecular moieties. These can be inserted into the crystal structure with little effort, while at the same time chemically meaningful binding and angular restraints are set. DSR was developed because the previous description of disorder in crystal structures with SHELXL was very lengthy and error-prone. Instead of editing large text files manually and defining restraints manually, this process is automated with DSR.

Application 

DSR can be started in a command line. The call has the basic form:
 dsr [option] (SHELXL file)
DSR is controlled with a special command in the respective SHELXL file. This has the following syntax:
 REM DSR PUT/REPLACE "fragment" WITH (atoms) ON (atoms oder q-peaks) PART 1 OCC -21 =
   RESI DFIX
The DSR command must always start with REM so that SHELXL does not recognize this line as own command. Behind WITH and ON stands which atom of the molecule fragment from the database to which atom or q-peak is to be positioned in the crystal structure.

By running
 dsr -r file.res 
the fragment fit is performed and the restraints transferred.

Graphical User Interface 

Since 2016 ShelXle has a graphical interface to DSR. Most commands of the command line version can be executed there.

In order to transfer a fragment into a structure, three atoms / q-peaks have to be selected in ShelXle and in the DSR GUI each to specify the position of the fragment. The 3D view of the fragment then shows a preview of the subsequent fragment fit.

Programming 

DSR is only programmed in Python. Therefore, it runs in any Python-supported operating system.

It is under the free Beerware license and can be downloaded free of charge and changed as desired.

References

External links 
 

Crystallography software
Python (programming language) software